"Evil Woman", sometimes titled "Evil Woman (Don't Play Your Games with Me)", is a song by Minneapolis–St. Paul-based band Crow, on their 1969 album Crow Music. It reached number 19 on the US Billboard Hot 100 pop chart and number 65 in Australia.

Chart performance

Black Sabbath version

The song was covered in 1969 by Black Sabbath and was released in England as the band's first-ever single. The song also appeared on the European version of the band's debut album, Black Sabbath, though it was excluded from versions released in other markets and was replaced by its B-side, "Wicked World", on the American version of the album.

The song was not officially released in North America until 2002, when it was included on the compilation album Symptom of the Universe: The Original Black Sabbath 1970–1978. It was later included on another compilation album, "Black Sabbath: The Ultimate Collection", released in 2016.

Other recordings
 A gender swapped version of the song, retitled "Evil Man", was recorded by Ike & Tina Turner, and released on their May 1970 album Come Together.
 Jazz Sabbath released an instrumental jazz rendition of this song on their 2020 self-titled debut album.
 British heavy metal band Saxon covered the song on their 2021 album of covers Inspirations.

References

1969 songs
1969 singles
1970 debut singles
Black Sabbath songs
Fontana Records singles
Vertigo Records singles